Pareuxoa luteicosta is a moth of the family Noctuidae. It is found in the Maule Region of Chile.

The wingspan is about 32 mm. Adults are on wing from January to March.

External links
 Noctuinae of Chile

Noctuinae
Endemic fauna of Chile